Albert G. Mathews (July 31, 1872 – December 5, 1958) was the Democratic President of the West Virginia Senate from Calhoun County and served from 1933 to 1935. He died of cancer in 1958.

References

West Virginia state senators
Presidents of the West Virginia State Senate
1872 births
1958 deaths
People from Ritchie County, West Virginia
People from Grantsville, West Virginia